Francisco Queriol Conde Júnior (born 22 November 1965), known as Chiquinho Conde, is a Mozambican former footballer who played as a striker, currently manager of Mozambique.

Most of his extensive professional career was spent in Portugal, mainly with Vitória de Setúbal, also having a spell in the United States in 1997. Over the course of 13 seasons, he amassed Primeira Liga totals of 309 games and 85 goals.

Conde represented Mozambique in three Africa Cup of Nations. In 2005, he started working as a coach.

Playing career
Born in Beira, Conde arrived in Portugal in the summer of 1987 from CD Maxaquene, and would remain in the country for the following decade, starting with C.F. Os Belenenses. After good spells at S.C. Braga and Vitória F.C. he signed with Sporting CP, but failed to reproduce his previous form, returning to Belenenses in January 1996.

Conde moved to the recently created Major League Soccer aged 31, where he represented the New England Revolution and the Tampa Bay Mutiny. In January 1998 he returned to Portugal and a former club, Vitória Setúbal (his third stint); in the first full season upon his return he scored 14 goals, as they qualified for the UEFA Cup as fifth.

After spells at F.C. Alverca and Portimonense SC, Conde eventually retired in 2005 after playing amateur football in the country. He represented Mozambique for 15 years, appearing at the 1986, 1996 and 1998 Africa Cup of Nations tournaments, with the national side finishing bottom of the group on all three occasions; he was regarded as one of the best players the country ever produced, alongside Dário and Tico-Tico.

Coaching career
Conde worked as a manager after retiring, being in charge of several teams in the Moçambola and also coaching Vitória Setúbal's under-23s. In October 2021, the 55-year-old replaced the dismissed Horácio Gonçalves at the helm of the Mozambique national side.

References

External links

 

1965 births
Living people
People from Beira, Mozambique
Mozambican footballers
Association football forwards
C.D. Maxaquene players
Primeira Liga players
Liga Portugal 2 players
Segunda Divisão players
C.F. Os Belenenses players
S.C. Braga players
Vitória F.C. players
Sporting CP footballers
F.C. Alverca players
Portimonense S.C. players
Imortal D.C. players
C.D. Montijo players
Major League Soccer players
New England Revolution players
Tampa Bay Mutiny players
Major League Soccer All-Stars
Mozambique international footballers
1986 African Cup of Nations players
1996 African Cup of Nations players
1998 African Cup of Nations players
Mozambican expatriate footballers
Expatriate footballers in Portugal
Expatriate soccer players in the United States
Mozambican expatriate sportspeople in Portugal
Mozambican expatriate sportspeople in the United States
Mozambican football managers
C.D. Maxaquene managers
Mozambique national football team managers
Expatriate football managers in Portugal